Hong Kuk-hyon (or  ; born 1 July 1990) is a North Korean judoka. He was Asian champion in 2013. He also won the silver medal at the World Championships in 2014.

In the IJF circuit, he has won a gold in the Qingdao Grand Prix in 2014, and bronzes in the Ulaanbaatar and Tashkent Grands Prix in 2014 and 2015, respectively.

Career

Beginnings: 2009 - 2012 
Hong began his international judo career at half-lightweight (-66 kg). His first tournament was at the World Cup Bucharest in 2009. He won his first fight by yuko, then lost in his second fight to Poland's Pawel Zagrodnik by two yukos, despite scoring one. Hong then competed in his first Grand Prix in Qingdao, but lost in golden score to Liu Renwang in the Round of 16.

Hong had a breakthrough in his career when he won a bronze medal at the 2010 Asian Games in Guangzhou. He played ippon judo in his first three fights, but lost by ippon and yuko to Jumpei Morishita in the quarter-final. He then won the bronze medal against Islam Baialinov by yuko.

Hong next won his second international medal at the World Cup in Madrid. He played for ippon in the quarter-final and semi-final, however lost in the final by ippon and yuko against Deniss Kozlovs. His next tournament was at the World Cup in Ulaanbaatar. He defeated his first opponent by ippon and waza-ari, but lost in the quarter-final to An Jeong-hwan and in the repechage to Musashi Ugura, both by ippon.

Hong competed in his first continental championships in Abu Dhabi in 2011. He won in the Round of 16 by ippon, waza-ari and yuko, but lost by ippon in the quarter-final and repechage again. He then went on to fight in his first World Championships among a massive group of 128 judokas in the half-lightweight. He lost against Igor Soroca in his first fight that lasted over seven minutes before he was thrown for ippon.

Hong returned to the Grand Prix in Qingdao and lost in the quarter-final. In 2012, he competed at the Grand Prix in Düsseldorf but lost in his first fight. He then lost in his second fight at the Grand Prix in Prague, which was his final tournament at half-lightweight.

Successful transition to lightweight: 2013 Asian Championships and World Championships

Rise to prominence: 2014 World Championships

Qualification for the 2016 Olympics

Fighting style

Competitive Record 

(as of 6 August 2016)

References

External links

 
 

North Korean male judoka
1990 births
Living people
Judoka at the 2016 Summer Olympics
Olympic judoka of North Korea
Asian Games medalists in judo
Judoka at the 2010 Asian Games
Judoka at the 2014 Asian Games
Asian Games bronze medalists for North Korea
Medalists at the 2010 Asian Games
Medalists at the 2014 Asian Games